Shawnee State Park can refer to either of two state parks in the United States:

Shawnee State Park (Ohio)
Shawnee State Park (Pennsylvania)